Q69 may refer to:
 Q69 (New York City bus)
 Al-Haqqa, the 69th surah of the Quran
 
 Ocean Ridge Airport, in Mendocino County, California, United States